The 2011 World Junior Wrestling Championships were the 36th edition of the World Junior Wrestling Championships and were held in Bucharest, Romania between 26–31 July 2011.

Medal table

Medal summary

Men's freestyle

Greco-Roman

Women's freestyle

References

External links 
 UWW Database

World Junior Championships
International wrestling competitions hosted by Romania
Sports competitions in Bucharest
Sport in Romania
Wrestling in Romania
World Junior Wrestling Championships